Here's to Romance is a 1935 American musical comedy film directed by Alfred E. Green and starring Nino Martini, Genevieve Tobin and Anita Louise.

Synopsis
The wife of a music teacher, who has been angered by her husband's philandering, arranges to send one of his male students to study opera in Paris as her protégé. This causes complications when he falls in love in France with a woman who is upset about his relationship with his patron. Devastated he ends up back in New York as a sheet music salesman. Things soon change when he is reunited with his true love and is invited to perform by the Metropolitan Opera.

Main cast
 Nino Martini as Nino Donelli
 Genevieve Tobin as Kathleen Gerard
 Anita Louise as Lydia Lubov
 Maria Gambarelli as Rosa
 Ernestine Schumann-Heink as herself
 Reginald Denny as Emery Gerard
 Vicente Escudero as Spanish Gypsy Dancer
 Adrian Rosley as Sandoval
 Mathilde Comont as Viola
 Elsa Buchanan as Enid
 Miles Mander as Bert
 Keye Luke as Saito
 Pat Somerset as Fred
 Albert Conti as LeFevre
 Egon Brecher as Descartes
 Orrin Burke as Carstairs
 Armand Kaliz as Andriot

References

Bibliography
 Solomon, Aubrey. The Fox Film Corporation, 1915–1935: A History and Filmography. McFarland, 2011.

External links

1935 films
Fox Film films
1935 musical comedy films
American musical comedy films
Films directed by Alfred E. Green
Films set in Paris
Films set in New York City
Films about opera
American black-and-white films
20th Century Fox films
1930s English-language films
1930s American films